Berth Marks is the second sound film starring Laurel and Hardy and was released on June 1, 1929.

Plot
Stan and Ollie are musicians traveling by sleeper train to perform in Pottsville, Pennsylvania, a popular vaudeville location at the time. They manage to board, but Stan drops a lot of their music, much to Ollie's annoyance. They antagonize a very short passenger (Sammy Brooks) by sitting on him and then frighten a woman who is getting undressed, when they enter a private car when looking for their berth. Her angry husband comes out and rips the coat of a man who had nothing to do with the intrusion; this man blames another innocent bystander, which leads to a tit-for-tat of clothes tearing.

Stan and Ollie spend most of the trip trying to change into pyjamas and get comfortable in a cramped upper berth. By the time they manage to sort themselves out, they have reached their stop; meanwhile the conductor is caught up in the general mayhem caused by the passengers still tearing each others clothes. In their haste to leave the train, Stan leaves their instrument behind and Ollie chases him down the track, as the train fades into the distance.

Cast

Production notes
Berth Marks was the second sound film released by Laurel and Hardy. A silent version was also made for cinemas that were not yet wired to show talking pictures. Action and dialogue scripts were written mid-April 1929, with filming taking place between April 20–27, 1929.

Several of the train sequences (including some not used in the English release) were utilized for foreign language versions of The Laurel-Hardy Murder Case in 1930. Overall there were three different versions of The Laurel-Hardy Murder Case combined with Berth Marks, released for the foreign language market:-
 Feu mon oncle - French
 Noche de duendes - Spanish
 Spuk um Mitternacht - German

Berth Marks was reissued in 1936 with a music score added to introductory scenes. This version and was subsequently included on the 10-disc Laurel & Hardy: The Essential Collection DVD set, as well as the Spanish Noche de duendes. In 2020 both the 1936 soundtrack version and the original 1929 soundtrack version were issued on "Laurel & Hardy - The Definitive Restorations" DVD and Blu-Ray collections.

References

External links 
 
 
 
 

1920s English-language films
1929 short films
1929 comedy films
American short films
American black-and-white films
Laurel and Hardy (film series)
Rail transport films
Metro-Goldwyn-Mayer short films
Short films directed by Lewis R. Foster
Films with screenplays by H. M. Walker
Fiction about rail transport
1920s American films
Films set in Pennsylvania